Lieutenant-General Alexander George Fraser, 17th Lord Saltoun KStG KMT (22 April 1785 – 18 August 1853), was a Scottish representative peer and a British Army general who fought in the Napoleonic Wars and the First Opium War.

Biography
He served with the grenadiers in Sicily (1806), at Coruna (1808), on Walcheren (1809), and in Spain and France from 1812 to 1814. In 1815, Lord Saltoun fought as a captain in the First Regiment of Guards (later the Grenadier Guards) in the Orchard at Hougomont on the morning of the Battle of Waterloo. During the battle he had four horses shot from underneath him. 
"Towards the close of Waterloo day he returned to his place in the line with about but one-third of the men with whom he had gone into action. He then took a prominent part in the last celebrated charge of the Guards."

Following Waterloo he was created both a Knight of St. George of Russia (KStG) and also a knight of the Austrian Military Order of Maria Theresa (KMT).

Fraser was described by Wellington as a "pattern to the army both as man and soldier."

He was appointed a Knight Grand Cross of the Royal Guelphic Order (GCH) in 1821 and a Knight of the Thistle in 1852. He was a Scottish representative peer from 1807 until his death and a Lord of the Bedchamber from 1821.

He was promoted to the rank of major-general in 1837 and later commanded the first brigade in the Battle of Chinkiang (1842) during the First Opium War and afterwards the whole force until 1843. He was further promoted to lieutenant-general in 1849.

Family
He was the son of Alexander Fraser, 16th Lord Saltoun (1758–1793) and Margaret, only daughter of Simon Fraser of Ness Castle. Fraser married the daughter of Lord Chancellor Thurlow. Fraser died in Rothes, Scotland on 18 August 1853.

Notes

References 

 Endnotes:
J. F.Foster's Peerage; 
Gentleman's Magazine, October 1853;
Royal Military Calendar; 
Hart's Army List; 
Hamilton's History of the Grenadier Guards
Siborne's Waterloo.

|-

1785 births
1853 deaths
55th Regiment of Foot officers
British Army generals
British Army personnel of the Napoleonic Wars
British military personnel of the First Opium War
Clan Fraser
Deputy Lieutenants of Aberdeenshire
Knights Commander of the Order of the Bath
Knights of the Thistle
Queen's Royal Regiment officers
Scottish representative peers
Scottish generals
Recipients of the Order of St. Vladimir, 4th class
Recipients of the Waterloo Medal
Lords Saltoun
Knights Cross of the Military Order of Maria Theresa